The men's field hockey tournament at the 2008 Summer Olympics was the 21st edition of the field hockey event for men at the Summer Olympic Games. It was held over a thirteen-day period beginning on 11 August, and culminating with the medal finals on 23 August. All games were played at the hockey field constructed on the Olympic Green in Beijing, China.

Germany won the gold medal for the third time after defeating Spain 1–0 in the final. Defending champions Australia won the bronze medal by defeating Netherlands 6–2. This was the only edition India has missed out in its Olympic history.

Competition format
The twelve teams in the tournament were divided into two pools of six, with each team initially playing round-robin games within their pool. Following the completion of the round-robin, the top two teams from each pool advance to the semifinals. All other teams play classification matches to determine the final tournament rankings. The two semi-final winners meet for the gold medal match, while the semi-final losers play in the bronze medal match.

Qualification
Each of the continental champions from five federations and host received an automatic berth. The European and Asian federations received two and one extra quotas respectively based upon the FIH World Rankings at the completion of the 2006 World Cup. In addition to the three teams qualifying through the Olympic Qualifying Tournaments, the following twelve teams, shown with final pre-tournament rankings,  competed in this tournament.

Umpires
Fifteen umpires for the men's event were appointed by the FIH. During each match, a video umpire was used to assist the on-field umpires in determining if a goal had been legally scored.

Squads

Preliminary round
All times are China Standard Time (UTC+08:00)

Pool A

Pool B

Classification round

Fifth to twelfth place classification

Eleventh and twelfth place

Ninth and tenth place

Seventh and eighth place

Fifth and sixth place

Medal round

Semi-finals

Bronze medal match

Gold medal match

Statistics

Final standings

Goalscorers

References

External links
Official FIH website

 
Men